Kipkirui (or Kipkurui) is a name of Kenyan origin that may refer to:

Kipkurui Misoi (born 1978), Kenyan steeplechase runner
Moses Kipkirui (born 1985), Kenyan steeplechase runner competing for Qatar as Musa Amer Obaid
Willy Cheruiyot Kipkirui (born 1974), Kenyan marathon runner and four-time Eindhoven Marathon winner

See also
Kirui, origin of name Kipkirui from Kip (meaning "son of") + Kirui

Kalenjin names